José Ramón Cepero Stadium is a multi-use stadium in Ciego de Ávila, Cuba.  It is currently used mostly for baseball games and is the home stadium of Ciego de Ávila Tigres.  The stadium holds 13,000 people.

Baseball venues in Cuba
Buildings and structures in Ciego de Ávila Province